Jega Veerapandian is an Indian politician. He was a former member of the Tamil Nadu legislative assembly elected from Mayuram constituency as a Bharatiya Janata Party candidate in 2001. He is also the president of General Labour Organisation (GLO),Mayiladuthurai .

References

Living people
Bharatiya Janata Party politicians from Tamil Nadu
Year of birth missing (living people)
Place of birth missing (living people)